Scott Leo "Taye" Diggs (born January 2, 1971) is an American stage and film actor. He is known for his roles in the Broadway musicals Rent and Hedwig and the Angry Inch, the TV series Private Practice (2007–2013), Murder in the First (2014–2016), and All American (2018–2023), and the films How Stella Got Her Groove Back (1998), Brown Sugar, Chicago (both 2002), Malibu's Most Wanted (2003), and The Best Man (1999) and its sequel, The Best Man Holiday (2013).

Early life
Diggs was born in Newark, New Jersey, and grew up in the South Wedge neighborhood of Rochester, New York. His mother, Marcia (née Berry), was a teacher and actress, and his father, Andre Young, is a visual artist. When he was a child, his mother married Jeffries Diggs, whose surname Taye took. His nickname, Taye, comes from the playful pronunciation of Scotty as "Scottay". He is the oldest of five children. He has two brothers, Gabriel and Michael, and two sisters, Christian and Shalom. He attended Allendale Columbia School in Rochester and later transferred to School of the Arts. He received a BFA in musical theater in 1993 from Syracuse University College of Visual and Performing Arts.

Diggs performed many times at the popular Lakes Region Summer Theatre in Meredith, New Hampshire. He also spent the summer of 1992 at the New London Barn Playhouse in New London, New Hampshire. His Broadway debut was in the ensemble cast of the 1994 Tony Award-winning revival of the musical Carousel. In 1995, he also performed as a dancer in Sebastian's Caribbean Carnival at Tokyo Disneyland.

Career
In 1996, Diggs originated the role of the landlord Benny in Jonathan Larson's Tony Award- and Pulitzer Prize-winning Rent, which also starred his future wife, Idina Menzel. After Rent, he appeared as Mr. Black opposite Menzel's character of Kate in Andrew Lippa's off-Broadway production of The Wild Party at Manhattan Theatre Club. Diggs also played The Bandleader in the 2002 film version of the long-running Broadway revival of Chicago and filled in as Billy Flynn on Broadway. He also temporarily filled in for Norbert Leo Butz (an original Rent standby) as the love interest Fiyero of Menzel's Elphaba character in Wicked.

Diggs then moved from stage to television with a role on the soap opera Guiding Light. In 1998, he made his film debut in How Stella Got Her Groove Back, which brought Diggs much acclaim and exposure. The following year, he played a tantric sex god in Doug Liman's Go, and AWOL groom in the coming-of-age drama The Wood alongside Omar Epps. Malcolm D. Lee's The Best Man features Diggs as the title character, an author and best friend of the groom (portrayed by Morris Chestnut).

He also starred in the 1999 remake of William Castle's House on Haunted Hill. Diggs was featured in an episode of America's Next Top Model helping the contestants through an acting challenge. Another notable role of his was on the comedy-drama Ally McBeal as a lawyer named Jackson Duper who was the love interest of the character Renee Raddick and the possible love interest of the Ling Woo character.

Diggs portrayed the title character on the short-lived UPN television series Kevin Hill which despite critical acclaim was not renewed for a second season. He reprised the role of Benny for the 2005 Rent film. Diggs is featured on the following cast recordings: Carousel 1994 revival cast; Rent 1996 original Broadway cast; The Wild Party original off-Broadway cast. He also sings on the Rent film soundtrack. In 2002, he reprised his role as the Bandleader in the film adaptation of Chicago, and also played opposite Christian Bale as Bale's partner/antagonist Brandt in the dystopian sci-fi thriller Equilibrium.

In 2003, Diggs appeared on the TV show Punk'd after being tricked by Ashton Kutcher, while getting a check-up at a Punk'd-operated doctor's office. In early 2006, Diggs guest-starred for several episodes as Will Truman's love interest, James, on the eighth season of Will & Grace. In May, ABC picked up his pilot, Day Break, in which he portrayed a detective trapped in the same day and forced to relive it to clear his name of murder; the show debuted in mid-November 2006, but was abruptly canceled due to poor ratings. Although his film and television career continue to move forward, he still returns to the stage frequently. He was seen opposite James McDaniel in Charles Fuller's A Soldier's Play at Second Stage Theatre in New York.

Diggs co-starred as Sam Bennett opposite Kate Walsh in Private Practice, the spin-off of Grey's Anatomy, which ran for six seasons from 2007 until 2013. Diggs had a guest role on The West Wing as a Secret Service agent in charge of the security detail for the President's daughter. He then guest-starred on Grey's Anatomy again in a Grey's Anatomy/Private Practice crossover event. Diggs had a major role in the live action adaptation of the comic Dylan Dog: Dead of Night (2011). He also narrated the ESPN Films documentary The Fab Five about University of Michigan basketball players Chris Webber, Juwan Howard, Jalen Rose, Jimmy King, and Ray Jackson. Diggs is one of the stars of the independent film drama Between Us that won the grand jury prize at the 2012 Bahamas International Film Festival among its other festival appearances.

From 2014 until 2016, Diggs starred in the TNT serial crime drama Murder in the First with Kathleen Robertson. The show ran for three seasons. Diggs is the author of four children's books, Mixed Me! (2015), Chocolate Me (2015), I Love You More Than... (2018), and My Friend! (2021), all illustrated by Shane Evans (artist). Diggs performed the role of the titular character Hedwig in the Broadway production of Hedwig and the Angry Inch at the Belasco Theatre from July 22, 2015, until the production's closing on September 13, 2015. In 2017, Diggs appeared in the films 'Til Death Do Us Part and My Little Pony: The Movie, where he voices Capper the cat.

Diggs has twice appeared on Paramount Network’s reality competition series Lip Sync Battle and is the show's only two-time winner. In a third season episode against Ne-Yo, Diggs sang his competitor’s song “Let Me Love You (Until You Learn to Love Yourself)” and then performed as Madonna for round two’s performance of "Vogue". In his next appearance, the fourth season’s Christina Aguilera tribute episode, he competed against Erika Jayne, performing “Beautiful” and "Candyman".

Diggs hosted the game show Hypnotize Me with hypnotist Keith Barry, based on Barry's British program You're Back in the Room. Hypnotize Me was originally shot for broadcast on FOX in 2016, but never aired on the network. The eight-episode series was eventually broadcast on The CW, in the summer of 2019.

Personal life
Diggs is the co-artistic director of a dance company, Dre.dance, with fellow Broadway veteran and School of the Arts alumnus Andrew Palermo.

Diggs married his Rent co-star,  actress Idina Menzel, on January 11, 2003. Their son, Walker Nathaniel Diggs, was born on September 2, 2009. In 2013, the couple separated after ten years of marriage. Their divorce was finalized on December 3, 2014.

In late 2021, Diggs began a relationship with Love & Hip Hop: Hollywood star Apryl Jones, who is the mother of singer Omarion's children.

Filmography

Film

Television

Music videos

Awards and nominations

In popular culture
In 2012, in the "Dr. Klaustus" episode of the animated series American Dad!, the character Roger sees a picture of Diggs in a magazine and comments that he is "still perfect". He refers to Diggs as "my constant, my ebony north star".
On the NBC series Parks and Recreation, Diggs is often referenced by character Tom Haverford, who likens himself to Diggs. He also fantasizes about co-owning a burlesque nightclub with Diggs and two of the Pussycat Dolls.
On the NBC series 30 Rock, Diggs is referenced as a male-excellence example by Jack Donaghy: " If I were dating a man he would be at the top of my list, with Michael Jordan, Denzel Washington." 
On the ABC/TBS television series Cougar Town, the character Laurie Keller is shown to have a crush on Diggs. She describes his smile as one that "lights up the world" and has numerous pictures of him in her apartment.
Season 4 episode 10 of Unbreakable Kimmy Schmidt: the only people who follow Fran’s girlfriend Monica on Twitter are her mother "and, of course, Taye Diggs".

References

External links
 
 
 
 Taye Diggs interview 

1971 births
Living people
20th-century American male actors
21st-century American male actors
African-American male actors
American male film actors
American male musical theatre actors
American male television actors
Male actors from Newark, New Jersey
Outstanding Performance by a Cast in a Motion Picture Screen Actors Guild Award winners
Musicians from Brooklyn
Male actors from Rochester, New York
Syracuse University College of Visual and Performing Arts alumni
20th-century African-American male singers
21st-century African-American people